Major-General Peter James Glover  (1913–2009) was a British Army officer.

Military career
Educated at Emmanuel College, Cambridge, Glover was commissioned into the Royal Artillery on 22 June 1934. After serving in the Second World War, he became Commander, Royal Artillery for 1st Infantry Division in February 1959, Commandant of the Royal School of Artillery in June 1960 and General Officer Commanding 49th (North Midlands and West Riding) Division and North Midland District of the Territorial Army in September 1962. He went on to be Defence Adviser in India in December 1963 and Director of the Royal Artillery in August 1966 before retiring in March 1969.

References

1913 births
2009 deaths
British Army major generals
Companions of the Order of the Bath
Officers of the Order of the British Empire
Royal Artillery officers
Alumni of Emmanuel College, Cambridge
British Army personnel of World War II